Mark Aloysius Opoya Owuya (born 18 July 1989) is a professional Swedish ice hockey goaltender. He is currently an unrestricted free agent who most recently played for the Utah Grizzlies of the ECHL. He formerly played for KHL Medveščak Zagreb, a member of the Kontinental Hockey League.

Playing career
Owuya began playing junior hockey with Djurgårdens IF in the 2005–06 season when he began playing with the U18 team. The following season Owuya played with both Djurgården's U18 and J20 team and also played most of the games with the Djurgården's J20 team in the 2007–08 season. While Stefan Ridderwall joined team Sweden for the 2008 World Junior Ice Hockey Championships, Owuya made his Elitserien debut on 3 January 2008, against Brynäs IF. He was loaned out to Mälarhöjden/Bredängs IK during the 2007–08 winter, and was also later loaned out to Almtuna IS for the entire 2008–09 season. 

Owuya was also on loan during the 2009–10 season, first to Örebro HK and later Mora IK. In the 2010 pre-season, Owuya was moved up to Djurgården's senior team, to compete with goaltender Stefan Ridderwall to be the first choice in the goal. Ultimately, Owuya played in 32 out of 55 games in the 2010–11 Elitserien season, with a 2.18 goals against average and league-best save percentage of .927. He also played in all of Djurgården's seven playoff games, with a 1.66 goals against average and a .924 save percentage.

International play

Owuya represented Sweden at the 2009 World Junior Ice Hockey Championships.

Personal
His father is from Uganda and his mother is from Russia. Mark's brother Sebastian was drafted by the Atlanta Thrashers in 2010. Owuya is also known in Sweden for rapping on popular talent show Idol as "Mark In Da Park".

References

External links

1989 births
Living people
Almtuna IS players
Djurgårdens IF Hockey players
Black ice hockey players
Idol (Swedish TV series) participants
KHL Medveščak Zagreb players
Las Vegas Wranglers players
Luleå HF players
Mora IK players
Örebro HK players
Reading Royals players
Ice hockey people from Stockholm
Swedish ice hockey goaltenders
Swedish people of Russian descent
Swedish people of Ugandan descent
Toronto Marlies players
Utah Grizzlies (ECHL) players